Jacoba G. Kapsenberg is a Dutch retired virologist who worked at the National Laboratory of Public Health, Utrecht, the Netherlands, from 1954 until 1989. There, she was responsible for viral diagnostics and developing the laboratory to the level of a national reference laboratory.

Career

In 1954, under the supervision of H.S. Frenkel, Kapsenberg published a new method to obtain a vaccine against smallpox virus in explanted fetal cow and sheep skin tissue in a liquid medium. The following year she completed her thesis, "Cultivation of vaccinia-virus in tissue explants", from the University of Amsterdam. She joined the Laboratory for Virology in 1956 and over subsequent years, developed it to the level of a national reference laboratory.

She identified some of the early cases of monkeypox in captive monkeys in the mid 1960s. In 1966, with Rijk Gispen, she detected monkeypox in healthy laboratory monkeys, but later revealed this was probably a result of contamination from monkeypox virus isolated in the same laboratory that tested samples from cases at an outbreak at Rotterdam Zoo. Between 1970 and 1986 rates of fatalities from monkeypox in Zaire, were worrying, but studies at the time observed that the virus was not easily transmissible between people, and Kapsenberg's studies concluded that the monkeypox virus could not spontaneously mutate into smallpox.

She was part of the group that first identified Human adenovirus 41 in children with diarrhoea in 1983.

Personal and family
Kapsenberg is affectionately known as Cootje. Her father was G. Kapsenberg from Groningen.

Selected publications

References

Bibliography

Further reading

External links

Living people
Dutch virologists
Date of birth unknown
Dutch women academics
20th-century Dutch scientists
20th-century Dutch women writers
Dutch academic administrators
University of Amsterdam alumni
Year of birth missing (living people)